Roland Robert (5 March 1937- 29 April 2014) was a Réunionese politician. 
He became mayor of La Possession in 1971 and general councillor of La Réunion in 1973.

References

1937 births
2014 deaths
French Communist Party politicians
Communist Party of Réunion politicians
Politicians of Réunion